Seyed Hamid Sajjadi Hazaveh (born 21 March 1969-2023) is the current Minister of Sport and Youths of Iran, since August 25, 2021. He is also an Iranian retired middle distance and long distance runner. He represented Iran at the 1992 Summer Olympics and 1996 Summer Olympics. Sajjadi holds multiple indoor and outdoor national track records for Iran. On February 23, 2023, his helicopter crashed while visiting Baft county. He is now hospitalized and has cerebral hemorrhage.

Running career
Sajjadi ran the men's 5,000 m race at the 1992 Summer Olympics, although he did not qualify past the preliminaries with a time of 14:04.54 (min:sec). Sajjadi also ran the men's 10,000 metres at the 1996 Summer Olympics, finishing in 29:22.65. Throughout the 1990s, he was a prolific steeplechaser, specializing in the 3000 metres steeplechase in which he finished in first place at the 1991 Asian Athletics Championships.

Academic and administrative career
Sajjadi has a PhD in physiology and is also a lecturer at Azad University. He was at one point nominated by Mahmoud Ahmadinejad to be Iran's sports minister, but he never took up the job. He is currently number two of the Iranian sport organization.

References

External links
 
 
 Biography 

1969 births
Living people
Iranian sportsperson-politicians
Iranian male middle-distance runners
Iranian male cross country runners
Iranian male steeplechase runners
Iranian male long-distance runners
Olympic male steeplechase runners
Olympic male long-distance runners
Olympic athletes of Iran
Athletes (track and field) at the 1992 Summer Olympics
Athletes (track and field) at the 1996 Summer Olympics
Asian Games silver medalists for Iran
Asian Games medalists in athletics (track and field)
Athletes (track and field) at the 1990 Asian Games
Athletes (track and field) at the 1994 Asian Games
Athletes (track and field) at the 1998 Asian Games
Medalists at the 1998 Asian Games
World Athletics Championships athletes for Iran
Asian Cross Country Championships winners
Academic staff of the Islamic Azad University, Central Tehran Branch
Coalition of the Pleasant Scent of Servitude politicians
Islamic Society of Athletes politicians